Shunbaisai Hokuei (d. 1837), also known as Shunkō III, was a designer of ukiyo-e style Japanese woodblock prints in Osaka, and was active from about 1824 to 1837. He was a student of Shunkōsai Hokushū.  Hokuei’s prints most often portray the kabuki actor Arashi Rikan II.

Shunbaisai Hokuei should not be confused with Tōkōen Hokuei (桃幸園 北英), an early 19th-century Edo (Tokyo) printmaker who is also commonly referred to as "Hokuei".

Notes

References
 Keyes, Roger S. & Keiko Mizushima, The Theatrical World of Osaka Prints, Philadelphia, Philadelphia Museum of Art, 1973, 265.
 Lane, Richard. (1978).  Images from the Floating World, The Japanese Print. Oxford: Oxford University Press. ;  OCLC 5246796
 Newland, Amy Reigle. (2005). Hotei Encyclopedia of Japanese Woodblock Prints.  Amsterdam: Hotei. ;  OCLC 61666175
 Roberts, Laurance P. (1976). A Dictionary of Japanese Artists. New York: Weatherhill. ;  OCLC 2005932

Ukiyo-e artists
19th-century Japanese people